Chalodeta  is a butterfly genus in the family Riodinidae. They are resident in the Neotropics.

Species list 
 Chalodeta chaonitis (Hewitson, [1866]) Mexico, Ecuador, Guyana, French Guiana, Trinidad and Tobago, Brazil
 Chalodeta chelonis (Hewitson, [1866]) Brazil
 Chalodeta chitinosa Hall, 2002 Venezuela, Colombia, Ecuador, Guyana, Bolivia, Brazil
 Chalodeta chlosine Hall, 2002 Colombia, Ecuador, Bolivia, Brazil, Peru
 Chalodeta lypera (Bates, 1868) Guatemala, Brazil
 Chalodeta panurga Stichel, 1910
 Chalodeta pescada Hall & Willmott, 1998 Ecuador
 Chalodeta theodora (C. & R. Felder, 1862) Brazil, Peru, Bolivia, Colombia

Sources
 Chalodeta at Markku Savela's website on Lepidoptera

External links
Images representing Chalodeta at Encyclopedia of Life
Images representing Chalodeta at Consortium for the Barcode of Life

Riodininae
Butterfly genera
Taxa named by Hans Ferdinand Emil Julius Stichel